JS Jinryū (SS-507) is the seventh boat of Sōryū-class submarines. She was commissioned on 7 March 2016.

Construction and career
Jinryū was laid down at Mitsubishi Heavy Industries Kobe Shipyard on January 21, 2011, as the 2011 plan 2900-ton submarine No. 8122 based on the medium-term defense capability development plan. At the launching ceremony, it was named Jinryū and launched on 8 October 2014. She's commissioned on 7 March 2016 and deployed to Kure.

Jinryū homeport is Kure.

Gallery

Citations

External links

2014 ships
Sōryū-class submarines
Ships built by Mitsubishi Heavy Industries